is a Japanese track and road cyclist, who currently rides for UCI Continental team . He competed in the keirin event at the 2014 UCI Track Cycling World Championships. He is also a professional keirin cyclist.

He has qualified to represent Japan at the 2020 Summer Olympics.

References

External links

1989 births
Living people
Japanese track cyclists
Japanese male cyclists
People from Fukui (city)
Cyclists at the 2014 Asian Games
Olympic cyclists of Japan
Cyclists at the 2016 Summer Olympics
Cyclists at the 2018 Asian Games
Asian Games competitors for Japan
Cyclists at the 2020 Summer Olympics